La Historia Continúa... Parte II (Eng.: The History Continues... Vol. 2) is a compilation album released by Marco Antonio Solís on May 24, 2005.

Track listing

all songs written and composed by Marco Antonio Solís

Chart performance

Sales and certifications

References

External links
Official website
 La Historia Continúa... Parte II on Amazon.com

2005 compilation albums
Marco Antonio Solís compilation albums
Fonovisa Records compilation albums